The 1995–96 Scottish League Cup was the 50th staging of the Scotland's second most prestigious football knockout competition, also known for sponsorship reasons as the Coca-Cola Cup.

The competition was won by Aberdeen, who defeated Dundee 2–0 in the final at Hampden Park.

First round

Second round

Third round

Quarter-finals

Semi-finals

Final

Scottish League Cup seasons
league Cup